First Active was an Irish bank, and former building society which was merged into Ulster Bank in late 2009, ceasing trading in February 2010.   It  traditionally offered a range of mortgages (including subprime mortgages), savings, investment, pension and life assurance products, but from 2007 onwards, also offered credit cards, ATM accounts and current accounts as well as online banking and Laser/Maestro debit cards.

History
The organisation was founded as the Workingman's Benefit Building Society in 1861, and it was legally incorporated in 1875.  Renamed First National Building Society in 1960, it became the first building society in Ireland to open a branch network, and during the 1970s and 1980s several other smaller building societies merged their business into that of First National. From the 1990s, it used an advertising campaign which involved contradicting received knowledge about finance. Examples included a representative telling "Most people" that there's no need to keep switching mortgage companies, finding "whoever said that you need to keep switching mortgages in order to get the best deal", and finding where it is written that it takes ages to get a decision on your mortgage.

The society demutualised in 1998 and was listed on the Irish and London Stock Exchanges as a under the new name of First Active plc. It was acquired by Royal Bank of Scotland Group in 2004. In 2004, Tesco Bank also began offering products provided by First Active.

On 26 January 2009, it was announced that First Active would cease to operate as a separate entity and its operations would be merged with those of Ulster Bank, with the loss of 750 jobs (550 in the Republic of Ireland and 200 in Northern Ireland).  From September 2009, it ceased offering any new products to customers in preparation for the merger.

References

External links

 Ulster Bank (Republic of Ireland) company website
 www.firstactive.ie

Defunct banks of Ireland
Financial services in the Republic of Ireland
NatWest Group
Banks established in 1861
Banks disestablished in 2010
1861 establishments in Ireland
2010 disestablishments in Ireland